The county of Denbighshire is in north-east Wales, occupying the Vale of Clwyd and the uplands to the west, east and south. There are 168 scheduled monuments in the county. The oldest is from 225,000 years ago, the oldest inhabited site in Wales. A further three limestone cave systems also have Paleolithic deposits. Three chambered tombs date to the Neolithic. The moorlands in particular are home to many of the 100 Bronze Age and Iron Age, the vast majority of which are burial mounds. There are some 21 hill forts and other enclosure sites, and several stone circles. There are only three sites from the Roman period, and none dating to Early Medieval times. From the Medieval period itself on the other hand, there are 40 sites, including castles, town walls, chapels, crosses, domestic buildings, defensive buildings, bridges and monastic sites. There are 18 post-medieval sites, being a very diverse mix of site types and dates. Most notable is the World Heritage Site at Pontcysyllte Aqueduct. The modern county of Denbighshire bears only slight alignment with the historic county of the same name. The modern county includes parts of historic Merionethshire and Flintshire.

Scheduled monuments have statutory protection. It is illegal to disturb the ground surface or any standing remains. The compilation of the list is undertaken by Cadw Welsh Historic Monuments, which is an executive agency of the National Assembly of Wales. The list of scheduled monuments below is supplied by Cadw with additional material from RCAHMW and Clwyd-Powys Archaeological Trust.

Scheduled monuments in Denbighshire

See also
List of Cadw properties
List of castles in Wales
List of hill forts in Wales
Historic houses in Wales
List of monastic houses in Wales
List of museums in Wales
List of Roman villas in Wales
Prehistoric Wales

References
Coflein is the online database of RCAHMW: Royal Commission on the Ancient and Historical Monuments of Wales, CPAT is the Clwyd-Powys Archaeological Trust, Cadw is the Welsh Historic Monuments Agency

Denbighshire